Abhishek Jain is an Indian film director and producer known for his Gujarati films Kevi Rite Jaish, Bey Yaar, and Wrong Side Raju.

Early life
Abhishek Jain was born on 3 August 1986 in Ahmedabad. He is a Marwari Jain. He received BBA degree from BK Majumdar Institute of Business Administration (BKMIBA); now part of Ahmedabad University, in 2006 and a degree in film-making from Whistling Woods in 2008.

Career

After finishing the course at Whistling Woods, he assisted Sanjay Leela Bhansali and Subhash Ghai on Guzaarish, Saawariya and Yuvvraaj.

After returning to Ahmedabad, Jain started working as a radio jockey on Radio Mirchi. Jain then met Mikhil Musale and Anish Shah during an international film festival in Ahmedabad and founded CineMan Productions in 2010. He made his debut film, Kevi Rite Jaish in Gujarati language. He was awarded Trend setter award by Gujarati Innovation Society due to the success of Kevi Rite Jaish. After the success of his debut movie, he directed Bey Yaar which was critically acclaimed and was commercially successful. In February 2016, Abhishek Jain announced that CineMan Productions will co-produce three Gujarati films with Phantom Films, out of which one will be directed by Abhishek himself. The first film released under joint banner of CineMan productions and Phantom films was  Wrong Side Raju, directed by Mikhil Musale, co-founder of CineMan productions, which won National Film Award for Best Feature Film in Gujarati at the 64th National Film Awards.

In June 2015, he published Aa To Just Vaat Chhe..., a book on his experiences while making his first two urban Gujarati films.

In April 2019, he was on board to the Hindi remake of the hit Kannada film Kirik Party, but he subsequently left the film. In 2021, he directed Hindi-language comedy drama film Hum Do Hamare Do.

Filmography

Films 

Assistant Director

Television

Books

Awards

See also
 CineMan Productions

References

External links 

 
 

Living people
Gujarati-language film directors
21st-century Indian film directors
Indian male screenwriters
Artists from Ahmedabad
1986 births
Gujarati people
Film directors from Gujarat
Film producers from Gujarat
Marwari people
Rajasthani people
Hindi-language film directors